Truro Church may refer to:

 Truro Church in Fairfax, Virginia, a congregation of the Diocese of the Mid-Atlantic in the Anglican Church in North America.
 Truro Cathedral (formally the Cathedral of the Blessed Virgin Mary) in Truro, Cornwall, United Kingdom, the cathedral of the Diocese of Truro in the Church of England.